Johannes C Russ was a coaster that was built in 1921 by Stettiner Oderwerke AG, Stettin for German owners. In 1942 she was wrecked off Sweden but was salvaged and returned to service. She was seized by the Allies in May 1945 at Flensburg, passed to the Ministry of War Transport (MoWT) and renamed Empire Connaught. In 1946, she was allocated to the Soviet Government and renamed Nemirovich Danchenko. She served until 1971, when she was scrapped.

Description
The ship was built in 1921 by Stettiner Oderwerke AG, Stettin.

The ship had a GRT of 998 and a NRT of 545.

The engine was built by Stettiner Oderwerke.

History
Johannes C Russ was built for Schiffart-und Assekuranz Gesellschaft GmbH. She was placed under the management of Ernst Russ, Hamburg. Her port of registry was Hamburg and the Code Letters RBVJ were allocated. In 1934, her Code letters were changed to DHNG. On 21 October 1941, Johannes C Russ was wrecked off Umeå, Sweden. She was later salvaged, repaired and returned to service.

Johannes C Russ was seized by the Allies in May 1945 at Flensburg. She was passed to the MoWT and renamed Empire Connaught. Her port of registry was changed to London. The Code Letters GKST and United Kingdom Official Number 180704 were allocated. In 1946, Empire Connaught was allocated to the Soviet Government and was renamed Nemirovich Danchenko. She served until she was scrapped in 1971.

Soviet Union period of this ship.
In winter 1947 the Soviet steamship Yakut was used in operations to tow the steamer Nemirovich Danchenko due to Nemirovich Danchenko already used mostly own coal during the voyage Panama - Kamchatka and lacked coal in Pacific Ocean to complete this voyage.

On 14 December 1947. The steamship Nemirovich Danchenko was without cargo and alongside the berth number 3 in Nagayev port. The ship loaded the coal in own hopper, the bunkering had place. On 19 December the ship still was alongside in Nagayev port, when two Soviet steamships General Vatutin; ex. Liberty class ship SS Jay Cooke) carrying 3,313 tonnes of Ammonal and TNT and Vyborg carrying 193 tonnes of chemistry substances exploded. Due to exploded ships had explosive cargo Nagayev settlement and port were in fire and partly ruined and other ships in the port including the steamship Nemirovich Danchenko were damaged more or less.

References

1921 ships
Ships built in Stettin
Steamships of Germany
Merchant ships of Germany
World War II merchant ships of Germany
Maritime incidents in October 1941
Ministry of War Transport ships
Empire ships
Steamships of the United Kingdom
Merchant ships of the United Kingdom
Steamships of the Soviet Union
Merchant ships of the Soviet Union
Soviet Union–United Kingdom relations
Germany–Soviet Union relations